The Week The Women Went was a television show produced by Paperny Films, and based on a BBC Three program of the same title.  The show was part documentary, part reality television, that explores what happens when all the women in an ordinary Canadian town disappear for a week and leave the men and children to cope on their own.

The first season of the show was taped in Hardisty, Alberta from June 2 to June 9, 2007 and consisted of eight one-hour episodes. The show first aired on CBC Television in Canada on January 21, 2008 and concluded on March 10, 2008. An estimated 1.2 million viewers watched the debut episode.

The second (and last) season of the show was shot in Tatamagouche, Nova Scotia from September 8 to September 15, 2008 and began airing on January 21, 2009.

References

External links
Paperny Films. The Week The Women Went
Pictures of the Community Project
Audio Interviews of Participants from Hardisty
 

2000s Canadian documentary television series
2000s Canadian reality television series
2008 Canadian television series debuts
CBC Television original programming
2009 Canadian television series endings
Women in Alberta
Women in Nova Scotia